Vatemo Ravouvou  (born 31 July 1990) is a Fiji rugby union player. He is currently playing for the Fiji sevens team.

In August 2016, he signed for Western Sydney Rams to play in the 2016 National Rugby Championship.

On April 27, 2018, it was announced by the Utah Warriors that he had signed for the remainder of the 2019 season and the entire 2020 season of Major League Rugby.

References

External links

 
 
 Zimbio Bio

Fiji international rugby union players
Fijian rugby union players
Place of birth missing (living people)
Living people
Fiji international rugby sevens players
1990 births
Rugby union centres
Rugby union wings
Pacific Islanders rugby union players
I-Taukei Fijian people
Fijian people of I-Taukei Fijian descent
Rugby union fly-halves
Rugby union fullbacks
Male rugby sevens players
Rugby sevens players at the 2016 Summer Olympics
Olympic rugby sevens players of Fiji
Olympic gold medalists for Fiji
Olympic medalists in rugby sevens
Medalists at the 2016 Summer Olympics
Commonwealth Games medallists in rugby sevens
Commonwealth Games silver medallists for Fiji
Rugby sevens players at the 2018 Commonwealth Games
People from Yasawa
Medallists at the 2018 Commonwealth Games